Haim Reich (9 April 1911 – 23 January 1965) was an Israeli football player and manager. As a player, he played as a midfielder for Maccabi Tel Aviv, Beitar Tel Aviv, Hapoel Tel Aviv, and the Mandatory Palestine national team.

Reich represented Mandatory Palestine in both their first and last international match, respectively against Egypt in 1934 and Lebanon in 1940; he made three official international caps.

References

External links
 

1911 births
1965 deaths
Jewish Israeli sportspeople
Association football midfielders
Mandatory Palestine footballers
Israeli footballers
Mandatory Palestine international footballers
Maccabi Tel Aviv F.C. players
Beitar Tel Aviv F.C. players
Hapoel Tel Aviv F.C. players
Israeli football managers
Hapoel Ramat Gan F.C. managers
Beitar Tel Aviv F.C. managers
Hapoel Kfar Saba F.C. managers